Elections to Stevenage Borough Council took place on 3 May 2018. This was on the same day as other local elections across the United Kingdom. One third of the council was up for election; the seats which were last contested in 2014. The Labour Party retained control of the council, which it had held continuously since 1973.

Result Summary

 

|-bgcolor=#F6F6F6
| colspan=2 style="text-align: right; margin-right: 1em" | Total
| style="text-align: right;" | 40
| colspan=5 |
| style="text-align: right;" | 22,720
| style="text-align: right;" | 
|-
|colspan="11" bgcolor=""|
|-
| style="background:"|
| colspan="10"| Labour hold

Ward Results

Bandley Hill

Bedwell

Chells

Longmeadow

Manor

Martins Wood

Old Town

Pin Green

Roebuck

Shephall

St Nicholas

Symonds Green

Woodfield

References

2018
2018 English local elections
2010s in Hertfordshire